Pagefield Vehicles was a British company manufacturing trucks and tipping gear. It was in business from 1904 to 1966, based with the Walker Brothers engineering firm at the Pagefield Iron Works in Wigan, Lancashire.

History 

The firm was established in 1904 as a general engineering company. In 1907 it produced 2-ton trucks. Between 1913 and 1931 it produced 4 ton trucks and 3.5 ton patented engine-operated tipping gear. A refuse collection vehicle of the 1930s, known as the "Pagefield Prodigy", featured a special short wheelbase chassis designed for operating in restricted spaces. 5-ton trucks were introduced in 1922, and 12-ton trucks, known as "6-trucks", in 1931.

In 1948, the company was reorganised and the name was changed to "Walkers and County Cars". The company ceased trading in 1966.

See also 

 List of truck manufacturers

Notes

External links
 Transport truck lorry wagon Pagefield
 Pagefield history

Defunct truck manufacturers of the United Kingdom
Vehicle manufacturing companies established in 1904
British brands